China Biosphere Reserve Network (CBRN) is a network established by the Chinese National Committee for UNESCO Man and the Biosphere Programme in 1993.  Membership in the CBRN serves as a prerequisite for joining the World Network of Biosphere Reserves.  At present there are 141 members in the CBRN, including 28 UNESCO Biosphere Reserves.

Note: "China Biosphere Reserve" is a nominal designation granted to the member reserves.

Beijing(2)
Songshan National Nature Reserve   
Baihuashan National Nature Reserve
Tianjin(2)
Paleocoast and Wetland National Nature Reserve 
Jixian Middle-Upper Proterozoic Stratigraphic Section National Nature Reserve
Hebei(4)
Changli Huangjin Hai'an National Nature Reserve   
Wulingshan National Nature Reserve   
Hengshuihu National Nature Reserve   
Liujiang Pendi Geological Remains National Nature Reserve
Shanxi(3)
Pangquangou National Nature Reserve   
Lishan National Nature Reserve   
Wutaishan Meadow Provincial Nature Reserve
Inner Mongolia(19)
Xilin Gol Grassland National Nature Reserve   
Saihan Ul National Nature Reserve   
Dalai Hu National Nature Reserve
Bayan Obo National Nature Reserve   
Heilihe National Nature Reserve   
Daheishan National Nature Reserve   
Horqin National Nature Reserve   
Xi Ordos National Nature Reserve   
Nei Mongol Helanshan National Nature Reserve   
Nei Mongol Darbin Hu National Forest Park     
Nei Mongol Huanggangliang National Forest Park
Dali Nur National Nature Reserve
Gogostai Haan Autonomous Regional Nature Reserve
Tumuji National Nature Reserve
Huihe National Nature Reserve
Honggolj Mongolian Scots Pine Forest National Nature Reserve
Da Hinggan Ling Hanma National Nature Reserve
National Alxa Bactrian Camel Genetic Resources Conservation Area
National Inner Mongolia Cashmere Goat(Alxa Type)Genetic Resources Conservation Area
Liaoning(5)
Shedao - Laotieshan National Nature Reserve  
Baishilazi National Nature Reserve   
Yiwulüshan National Nature Reserve   
Shuangtaihekou National Nature Reserve   
Chengshantou Coastal Landforms National Nature Reserve
Jilin(4)
Changbaishan National Nature Reserve  
Yitong Volcano Group National Nature Reserve   
Longwan National Nature Reserve
Xianghai National Nature Reserve
Heilongjiang(8)
Fenglin National Nature Reserve 
Wudalianchi National Nature Reserve
Zhalong National Nature Reserve   
Xingkaihu National Nature Reserve
Liangshui National Nature Reserve   
Huzhong National Nature Reserve   
Wuyiling National Nature Reserve 
Cuibei Wetland Provincial Nature Reserve
Shanghai(2)
Chongming Dongtan Birds National Nature Reserve   
Jiuduansha Wetland National Nature Reserve
Jiangsu(2)
Yancheng Littoral Mudflats and Valuable Fowls National Nature Reserve
Dafeng Père David's Deer National Nature Reserve
Zhejiang(4)
Tianmushan National Nature Reserve
Nanji Liedao Marine National Nature Reserve     
Lin'an Qingliangfeng National Nature Reserve   
Shangougou Scenic Area
Anhui(3)
Yaoluoping National Nature Reserve   
Shengjinhu National Nature Reserve   
Tongling Freshwater Dolphins National Nature Reserve
Fujian(6)
Wuyishan National Nature Reserve
Longqishan National Nature Reserve   
Meihuashan National Nature Reserve   
Fujian Fuzhou National Forest Park
Emeifeng Provincial Nature Reserve
Tianbaoyan National Nature Reserve
Jiangxi(6)
Poyanghu Migratory Birds National Nature Reserve   
Taohongling Sika Deer National Nature Reserve 
Jiulianshan National Nature Reserve
Jiangxi Wuyishan National Nature Reserve
Jinggangshan National Nature Reserve
Wuzhifeng Provincial Nature Reserve
Shandong(2)
Huanghe Sanjiaozhou National Nature Reserve   
Shanwang Paleofossil National Nature Reserve
Henan(2)
Baotianman National Nature Reserve
Jigongshan National Nature Reserve
Hubei(3)
Shennongjia National Nature Reserve  
Changjiang Tian'ezhou White-fin Dolphin National Nature Reserve 
White-fin Dolphin National Nature Reserve at Xinluo Section of Yangtze River
Hunan(1)
Badagongshan National Nature Reserve
Guangdong(10)
Dinghushan National Nature Reserve  
Nanling National Nature Reserve   
Chebaling National Nature Reserve   
Neilingdingdao-Futian National Nature Reserve   
Huidong Gangkou Sea Turtle National Nature Reserve   
Shenzhen CAS Xianhu Botanical Garden  
Zhujiangkou Chinese White Dolphin National Nature Reserve 
Leizhou Valuable and Rare Marine Organisms National Nature Reserve
Shixing Nanshan Provincial Nature Reserve
Xiangtoushan National Nature Reserve
Guangxi(9)
Shankou Mangrove Ecosystem National Nature Reserve   
Damingshan National Nature Reserve   
Huaping National Nature Reserve
Mao'ershan National Nature Reserve      
Beilunhekou National Nature Reserve       
Longgang National Nature Reserve
Dayaoshan National Nature Reserve
Mulun National Nature Reserve   
Jiuwanshan National Nature Reserve
Hainan(3)
Sanya Coral Reef National Nature Reserve   
Datian National Nature Reserve
Jianfengling National Nature Reserve
Sichuan(11)
Wolong National Nature Reserve
Jiuzhaigou National Nature Reserve   
Huanglong Scenic and Historic Interest Area  
Yading National Nature Reserve
Tangjiahe National Nature Reserve
Changning Zhuhai National Nature Reserve   
Miyaluo Provincial Park
Longxi - Hongkou National Nature Reserve
Dongyanggou Provincial Nature Reserve
Maozhai Provincial Nature Reserve
Micangshan National Nature Reserve
Guizhou(8)
Fanjingshan National Nature Reserve
Maolan National Nature Reserve 
Xishui Mid-subtropical Evergreen Broad-leaved Forest National Nature Reserve
Chishui Spinulose Tree Fern National Nature Reserve    
Mayanghe National Nature Reserve
Weining Caohai National Nature Reserve   
Leigongshan National Nature Reserve
Kuankuoshui National Nature Reserve
Yunnan(2)
Gaoligongshan National Nature Reserve   
Xishuangbanna National Nature Reserve
Tibet(1)
Qomolangma Feng National Nature Reserve
Shaanxi(6)
Foping National Nature Reserve   
Taibaishan National Nature Reserve
Changqing National Nature Reserve   
Hanzhong Crested Ibis National Nature Reserve
CAS Shaanxi Qinling Botanical Garden (aka Qinling National Botanical Gardens)
Niubeiliang National Nature Reserve
Gansu(4)
Baishuijiang National Nature Reserve  
Qilianshan National Nature Reserve   
Anxi Extreme-arid Desert National Nature Reserve   
Lianhuashan National Nature Reserve
Ningxia(2)
Helanshan National Nature Reserve   
Yunwushan Grassland Autonomous Regional Nature Reserve
Xinjiang(7)
Chinese Temperate Desert Region and the North Foot of Bogda Peak Biosphere Reserve  
Altun Shan National Nature Reserve   
Hanas National Nature Reserve
Tarim Euphrates Poplar National Nature Reserve   
Qitai Desert-Steppe Type Grassland Autonomous Regional Nature Reserve   
Xinyuan Mountain-Meadow Type Grassland Autonomous Regional Nature Reserve
Altai Shan Headwaters of the Ertis and Ulungur Rivers Autonomous Regional Nature Reserve

See also

List of UNESCO Biosphere Reserves in China
Protected areas of China
World Network of Biosphere Reserves in Asia and the Pacific

References
 

 
Bi
Cultural heritage of China
B
Biosphere